The Rome Classic was a women's professional golf tournament on the Ladies European Tour that took place at the Olgiata Golf Club in Italy.

Winners

Source:

References

External links
Ladies European Tour

Former Ladies European Tour events
Golf tournaments in Italy